Antanandranto, also Ankilibory, is a small town in southwest Madagascar. It lies southwest of the Lake Tsimanampetsotsa. It lies north of the villages of Anja-Belitsaka and Vohombe.

References

Populated places in Atsimo-Andrefana